There are a wide variety of doctoral degrees awarded to students in a number of different categories in the United States. Doctorates are not restricted to being based solely on research or academic coursework. The first research doctorate was the doctor of philosophy, which came to the U.S. from Germany, and is frequently referred to by its initials of Ph.D. As academia evolved in the country a wide variety of other types of doctoral degrees and programs were developed. Some of these included a focus on teaching such as the Doctor of Arts, others were simply a more specific curricula within a specific field such as the Doctor of Engineering or Doctor of Education of which may be identical in requirements, length, coursework and research to the Ph.D.

Additionally, there are a number of lower level (in terms of academic advancement) professional doctorates such as the Doctor of Medicine and the Juris Doctor that do not have a dissertation research component. In contrast to other countries worldwide a doctoral program generally requires the completion of a program of academic coursework in addition to other requirements for all types of doctoral degrees.

Types of doctorate
The United States Department of Education published a Structure of US Education in 2008 that differentiated between associate degrees, bachelor's degrees, first professional degrees, master's degrees, intermediate graduate qualifications and research doctorate degrees. This included doctoral degrees in the first professional degree, intermediate graduate qualification and research doctorate degree categories.

The Department of Education's National Center for Education Statistics divides U.S. doctorates into three categories for the purposes of its Integrated Postsecondary Education Data System (IPEDS): Doctor's degree-research/scholarship, Doctor's degree-professional practice and Doctor's degree-other. The Doctor's degree-research/scholarship is defined as "A Ph.D. or other doctor's degree that requires advanced work beyond the master's level, including the preparation and defense of a dissertation based on original research, or the planning and execution of an original project demonstrating substantial artistic or scholarly achievement." The Doctor's degree-professional practice is unofficially known as "doctor's degree" in the U.S. that is conferred upon completion of a program providing the knowledge and skills for the recognition, credential, or license required for professional practice but is defined by the department of education as a professional degree that lawyers and physicians complete to practice in their vocations. The degree is awarded after a period of study such that the total time to the degree, including both pre-professional and professional preparation, equals at least six full-time equivalent academic years." The Doctor's degree-other is defined as "A doctor's degree that does not meet the definition of a doctor's degree  research/scholarship or a doctor's degree  professional practice." The categorization of degrees for IPEDS is left to the awarding institutes.

The National Science Foundation (NSF) has published an annual census of research doctorates called the Survey of Earned Doctorates (SED) since 1957 with sponsorship from the NSF, NASA, the National Institutes of Health, the National Endowment for the Humanities, the U.S. Department of Agriculture, and the U.S. Department of Education. For the purposes of this survey, a research doctorate is defined as "a doctoral degree that (1) requires completion of an original intellectual contribution in the form of a dissertation or an equivalent culminating project (e.g., musical composition) and (2) is not primarily intended as a degree for the practice of a profession." The second point here – that a research doctorate is "not primarily intended as a degree for the practice of a profession" means that not all doctorates containing "an original intellectual contribution in the form of a dissertation or an equivalent culminating project" are regarded as research doctorates by the NSF. The NSF list of research doctorates is recognized internationally as establishing which U.S. doctorates are considered Ph.D.-equivalent, e.g. by the European Research Council.

The Department of Education's 2008 Structure of US Education listed 24 frequently awarded research doctorates titles accepted by the National Science Foundation (NSF) as representing "degrees equivalent in content and level to the Ph.D". This reflected the 24 doctorates recognized by the NSF in  Doctorate Recipients from U.S. Universities: Summary Report 2005. As of Doctorate Recipients from U.S. Universities: Summary Report 2006 this was reduced to 18, part of an ongoing program of assessment that saw the number of recognized research degrees reduced from the 52 recognized from 1994 (the earliest report archived online) to 1998, falling to 48 from 1999 to  2003 and to 24 in 2004. The number rose to 20 in 2007, with the Doctor of Design and Doctor of Fine Arts being re-recognized after being removed from the 2006 list, before falling again to 18 in 2008 when the Doctor of Music and Doctor of Industrial Technology were dropped. Since then, the list of recognized research degrees has been constant, although most Ed.D. degree programs were determined to have a professional rather than research focus and removed from the survey in 2010–2011; despite this, the Ed.D. remains the second most popular research doctorate in the SED after the Ph.D in 2014. (albeit with 1.1% of awards compared to 98.1% for the Ph.D.).

Research doctorates
In the United States the doctoral degrees that have been identified by various universities and others (including the NSF at various times) as having original research including a dissertation or equivalent have included:

Professional doctorates
In addition to the research doctorate, the US has many professional degrees, formerly referred to as first-professional degrees, which are titled as doctor's degrees and classified as "doctors degree  professional practice". While research doctorates require "advanced work beyond the master's level, including the preparation and defense of a dissertation based on original research, or the planning and execution of an original project demonstrating substantial artistic or scholarly achievement", professional doctorates must have a total time to degree (including prior study at bachelor's level) of at least six years, and provide "the knowledge and skills for the recognition, credential, or license required for professional practice".

Other doctorates
There are also some programs leading to awards titled as doctorates that meet neither the definition of the research doctorate nor those of the professional doctorate. These are classified as "doctor's degree  other".

References

Doctoral degrees
Education in the United States